Barista is a 2015 American documentary film directed by Rock Baijnauth. The film follows five baristas, as they prepare for the 2013 United States Barista Championship. It is the first in a series. Viewers are introduced into the elevation of the everyday drink, into a craft culture not unlike that of beer and wine. The film was acquired for distribution by Samuel Goldwyn Films.

Synopsis 
The film follows four baristas preparing for the 2013 United States Barista Championship. Eden-Marie Abramowicz, Charlie Habegger, Truman Severson and Ryan Redden obsessive over every detail when it comes to extracting the perfect cup of coffee. As the film progresses, the makers add a fifth personality, Los Angeles-based Charles Babinski, who decides to compete.

Babinski, who has endorsement deals with a major coffee brand, becomes the dominant personality. His cockiness provides a stark contrast to the humble obsessiveness of the other four personalities.

Sequel  
In 2019, the sequel to Barista, Baristas was released and was distributed by The Orchard.

References

External links
 
 
 
 

2015 films
Documentary films about food and drink
Films shot in Los Angeles
Films shot in Boston
American documentary films
Films about coffee
Coffee preparation
Documentary films about competitions
Baristas
Coffee culture
2010s English-language films
2010s American films